Heflin is a city and the county seat of Cleburne County, Alabama, United States. At the 2020 census, the population was 3,431. It is located approximately halfway between Birmingham and Atlanta along Interstate 20.

History

Heflin was first settled in 1882 as a station on the railroad line from Atlanta. The town quickly grew and was incorporated in 1886. Until 1905, the County Seat of Cleburne County had been located at Edwardsville. In 1905, an election was held to move the county seat from Edwardsville to Heflin. The election results favored Heflin and were appealed to and upheld by the Alabama Supreme Court on July 1, 1906.

Geography
Heflin is located at 33°38'37.514" North, 85°34'57.724" West (33.643754, −85.582701).

The city is located in the east central part of the state approximately 15 mi west of the Alabama-Georgia state line. Interstate 20 runs west to east through the southern part of the city. Access to the city can be found from exits 199 and 205. Via I-20, Birmingham is 76 mi (122 km) west, and Atlanta is 72 mi (116 km) east. U.S. Route 78 also runs through the city, along with two state routes (Alabama State Route 9 and Alabama State Route 46).

Climate

Demographics

2020

As of the 2020 United States census, there were 3,431 people, 1,340 households, and 677 families residing in the city.

2010
As of the census of 2010, there were 3,480 people in 1,384 households, including 925 families, in the city. The racial makeup of the city was 87.3% White, 9.4% Black or African American, 0.5% Native American, 0.1% Asian, 1.0% from other races, and 1.6% from two or more races. 2.4% of the population were Hispanic or Latino of any race.

Of the 1,384 households 28.0% had children under the age of 18 living with them, 48.5% were married couples living together, 13.2% had a female householder with no husband present, and 33.2% were non-families. 29.3% of households were one person and 14.4% were one person aged 65 or older. The average household size was 2.39 and the average family size was 2.94.

The age distribution was 22.6% under the age of 18, 8.6% from 18 to 24, 24.9% from 25 to 44, 26.1% from 45 to 64, and 17.8% 65 or older. The median age was 40.5 years. For every 100 females, there were 90.5 males. For every 100 females age 18 and over, there were 97.5 males.

The median household income was $29,821, and the median family income  was $37,050. Males had a median income of $41,932 versus $25,714 for females. The per capita income for the city was $16,909. About 15.6% of families and 22.0% of the population were below the poverty line, including 29.5% of those under age 18 and 15.9% of those age 65 or over.

2000
As of the census of 2000, there were 3,002 people in 1,218 households, including 824 families, in the city. The racial makeup of the city was 85.88% White, 11.83% Black or African American, 0.23% Native American, 0.33% Asian, 0.77% from other races, and 0.97% from two or more races. 1.93% of the population were Hispanic or Latino of any race.

Of the 1,218 households 28.9% had children under the age of 18 living with them, 52.3% were married couples living together, 11.7% had a female householder with no husband present, and 32.3% were non-families. 29.1% of households were one person and 15.7% were one person aged 65 or older. The average household size was 2.38 and the average family size was 2.94.

The age distribution was 22.4% under the age of 18, 8.5% from 18 to 24, 24.9% from 25 to 44, 25.2% from 45 to 64, and 19.1% 65 or older. The median age was 40 years. For every 100 females, there were 91.1 males. For every 100 females age 18 and over, there were 88.4 males.

The median household income was $28,398 and the median family income  was $38,600. Males had a median income of $29,545 versus $20,676 for females. The per capita income for the city was $15,452. About 11.9% of families and 16.3% of the population were below the poverty line, including 27.0% of those under age 18 and 18.4% of those age 65 or over.

Entertainment 

Heflin is home to the Hollis Speedway.

Education
Public education is provided in Heflin by the Cleburne County Board of Education. Public schools in Heflin include:
Cleburne County High School (grades 8 through 12)
Cleburne County Career Technical School (grades 9 through 12)
Cleburne County Middle School (grades 5 through 7)
Cleburne County Elementary School (grades K through 6)
Pleasant Grove Elementary School (grades K through 6)

Media
Radio stations
WKNG-FM 89.1 FM (Southern Gospel / Worship Music)
WPIL 91.7 FM  (Southern Gospel / Classic Country/Bluegrass)

Newspaper
Cleburne News (weekly)

Television

WSB (ABC affiliate) Atlanta
WAGA (FOX affiliate) Atlanta
WBRC (FOX affiliate) Birmingham
WCIQ (PBS affiliate) Mt. Cheaha State Park
WXIA (NBC affiliate) Atlanta
WVTM (NBC affiliate) Birmingham
WGWW-DT2 (ABC affiliate) Anniston
WIAT (CBS affiliate)  Birmingham
WANF (CBS affiliate)  Atlanta

Notable people 
Paul D. Adams, a Commanding General of the Third United States Army
Charlie Brown, former NFL and CFL player
John Merrill, Secretary of State of Alabama
Will Payne, producer, writer and director
Tyrone Prothro, former wide receiver for the University of Alabama
Todd Bates, former defensive lineman for University of Alabama, current defensive line coach for Clemson University.
Robert Rigsby Sr., former mayor of the city, funded most of the city's Christmas decorations and founded the Outdoor Jamboree.

References

External links

Official site
Cleburne County Schools web site
Cleburne News web site
Chamber of Commerce web site

Cities in Alabama
Cities in Cleburne County, Alabama
County seats in Alabama
Populated places established in 1882